The European Interbalkan Medical Center (Iatriko Diavalkaniko Kentro), is a major private general hospital located and based in Thessaloniki, Greece, on the road to the airport, opposite of the commercial center of Apollonia (Florida) and close to Mediterranean Cosmos. It was founded by businessman Giorgos Apostolopoulos in 2000. It offers a wide variety of medical and surgical treatments, and has 383 beds.

References

Hospitals in Thessaloniki
Hospitals established in 2000
Private hospitals in Greece
2000 establishments in Greece